Smålandsstenar is a locality situated in Gislaved Municipality, Jönköping County, Sweden with 4,530 inhabitants in 2010.

In sports Smålandsstenar Tennisclub have a central position as the most successful athletic-club developing tennis players such as ATP-ranked; Hans Simonsson, Stefan Simonsson, Håkan Johansson, Peter Svensson, Claes Persson and WTA-ranked Linda Åqvist.

References

External links

Populated places in Jönköping County
Populated places in Gislaved Municipality
Finnveden